The 2005 Zandvoort DTM round was a motor racing event for the Deutsche Tourenwagen Masters held between 26–28 August 2005. The event, part of the 19th season of the DTM, was held at the Circuit Zandvoort in Netherlands.

Results

Qualifying

Race

Championship standings after the race 

 Note: Only the top five positions are included for three sets of standings.

References

External links 
Official website

|- style="text-align:center"
| width="35%"| Previous race:
| width="30%"| Deutsche Tourenwagen Masters2005 season
| width="40%"| Next race:

Lausitzring DTM